Vardanes II was the son of Vologases I or Vardanes I and briefly ruler of parts of the Parthian Empire. In ancient records he only appears in Tacitus. Otherwise he is only known from coins that are dated between 55 to 58 CE. He rebelled against Vologases I at Seleucia from about 55 to 58 CE and must have occupied Ecbatana, since he issued coins from the mint there, bearing the likeness of a young beardless king wearing a diadem with five pendants. Nothing more about him is known.

References

Sources 
 
 
  
 
 

58 deaths
1st-century Parthian monarchs
Year of birth unknown
1st-century Iranian people